Roger Hansbury (born 26 January 1955) is an English former footballer who played as a goalkeeper. He made 377 appearances in the Football League, and also played in Hong Kong.

Hansbury was born in Barnsley, which was then in the West Riding of Yorkshire. He started his career with Norwich City, for whom he made 78 league appearances between 1974 and 1981, and spent spells on loan at Bolton Wanderers,  Cambridge United and Orient. Unable to dislodge Chris Woods or Kevin Keelan from Norwich's starting lineup, he moved to Hong Kong in 1981 to play for Eastern AA. He returned to England in 1983 and played for Burnley, Cambridge United for a second time, Birmingham City, from where he went on loan to Sheffield United, Wolverhampton Wanderers and Colchester United, and finally Cardiff City.

After retiring from football he ran a greetings card shop.

References

External links
Profile at sporting-heroes.net

Living people
1955 births
Footballers from Barnsley
English footballers
Association football goalkeepers
Norwich City F.C. players
Bolton Wanderers F.C. players
Cambridge United F.C. players
Leyton Orient F.C. players
Eastern Sports Club footballers
Burnley F.C. players
Birmingham City F.C. players
Sheffield United F.C. players
Wolverhampton Wanderers F.C. players
Colchester United F.C. players
Cardiff City F.C. players
English Football League players
Hong Kong First Division League players
English expatriate footballers
Expatriate footballers in Hong Kong
English expatriate sportspeople in Hong Kong